The UEFA Europa Conference League (abbreviated as UECL) is an annual football club competition organised by the Union of European Football Associations (UEFA) for eligible European football clubs. Clubs qualify for the competition based on their performance in their national leagues and cup competitions. It is the third tier of active European club football competitions, after the Champions League and the Europa League.

First contested in the 2021–22 season, the competition serves as the bottom level of the Europa League, which was reduced from 48 to 32 teams in the group stage. The competition is primarily contested by teams from lower-ranked UEFA member associations. No teams qualify directly to the group stage, with 10 teams eliminated in the Europa League play-offs and the rest coming from the Europa Conference League qualifiers. The winners of the competition are awarded a position in the Europa League the following season, unless they qualify for the Champions League.
Roma were the inaugural winners of the competition, having beaten Feyenoord 1–0 in the 2022 final.

History
UEFA had reportedly considered adding a third-tier competition since at least 2015, believing that a bottom-level tournament could act as a means of giving clubs from lower-ranked UEFA member countries a chance of progressing beyond their customary elimination from the Champions League and Europa League. In mid-2018, talk of an announcement intensified, with news sources claiming an agreement had already been reached for the competition to be launched and that the 48-team Europa League group stage would be split in two, with the lower half forming the nucleus of what would be the new event.

On 2 December 2018, UEFA announced that the competition – provisionally known as "Europa League 2" or just "UEL2" – was to be launched as part of the 2021–24 three-year competition cycle, with UEFA adding that the new tournament would bring "more matches for more clubs and more associations".

The official name of the competition, "UEFA Europa Conference League", was announced on 24 September 2019.

On 24 May 2021, UEFA revealed the competition's trophy and brand identity. The Europa Conference League Trophy stands 57.5cm tall and weighs 11kg.  The first ever goal in the Europa Conference League qualifiers was scored on 6 July 2021 by Mosta player Evo Christ in a 2021–22 qualifying round match against Spartak Trnava. The first ever goal in the Europa Conference League group stage was scored on 14 September 2021 by Maccabi Tel Aviv player Stipe Perica in a 2021–22 group stage match against Alashkert. On 30 September 2021, the competition's first ever hat-trick was scored by Harry Kane for Tottenham Hotspur in a group stage match against Mura. Kane came on as a 59th minute substitute at 2–1 before scoring three goals within 20 minutes of each other in order to finish off the game (5–1). 

On 24 February 2022, PAOK became the first ever team to win a Conference League tie on penalties, after beating Danish side Midtjylland 5–3 in a knockout round play-off match. On 5 May 2022, Feyenoord and Roma became the first teams ever to reach the final of UECL, ending with Roma crowned as the inaugural champions.

On 3 November 2022, West Ham United became the first side to win all six of their Conference League group stage matches, picking up wins against  FCSB, Silkeborg and Anderlecht.

Format

Qualification

Similar to the UEFA Champions League, qualification to the Europa Conference League is split into two paths – separating champions and non-champions – and contains three rounds plus a play-off. Unlike the Champions League, however, the Champions Path will only be contested by teams which lost the qualification for the Champions League group stage and consequently have been relegated either directly into the UEFA Europa Conference League (from UCL Q1&PR to UECL Q2) or via a second relegation from the UEFA Europa League as a result of two straight eliminations (from UCL Q2 to UEL Q3 then to UECL PO).

The association ranking based on the UEFA country coefficients is used to determine the number of participating teams in main path qualification for each association (excluding 3 relegations from UEL Q3 out of five N2s in associations 10–15 and three CWs in associations 13–15):
Nations ranked 1 to 5 have one team;
Nations ranked 6 to 15 have two teams;
Nations ranked 16 to 50 have three teams;
Nations ranked 51 to 55 have two teams;
Liechtenstein does not have a domestic league and will provide the winner of the Liechtenstein Football Cup irrespective of their coefficient ranking.

Based on this reorganisation, no association will benefit from more berths to continental football than they had before the 2021–24 competition cycle, with the tournament essentially being the lower orders of the existing Europa League tournament but split off into a secondary tournament.

Group stage and knockout phase
The format sees eight groups of four teams, followed by the round of 16, quarter-finals, semi-finals and final. An additional preliminary knockout round is played before the round of 16 between teams ranked second in their groups and the third-ranked teams of the UEFA Europa League groups. The new competition features 141 matches over 15 match weeks. 56 teams take part.

The final is played at a neutral venue. The winner of the competition is entitled to participate in the UEFA Europa League the following season. The competition's matches are played on Thursdays.

Distribution (from 2021–22 to 2023–24)
All qualification berths are based on UEFA's default assumption that each association will submit one domestic cup winner as its highest-ranked qualifier after those eligible to enter the Champions League, and will define its remaining entrants by their league position in the previous year. England allocates its lowest-ranked qualification place to the winners of the EFL Cup or, if it already qualified to Champions League or Europa League, to the sixth or seventh placed in the Premier League.

Distribution (from 2024–25)

Prize money
Similar to the UEFA Champions League and UEFA Europa League, the prize money received by the clubs is divided into fixed payments based on participation and results, and variable amounts that depend on the value of their TV market.

For the 2022–23 season, group stage participation in the Europa Conference League is awarded a base fee of €2,940,000. A victory in the group pays €500,000 and a draw €166,000. Also, each group winner earns €650,000 and each runner-up €325,000. Reaching the knock-out stage triggers additional bonuses: €300,000 for the round of 32, €600,000 for the round of 16, €1,000,000 for the quarter-finals and €2,000,000 for the semi-finals. The losing finalists receive €3,000,000 and the champions receive €5,000,000.
 First qualifying round elimination: €150,000
 Second qualifying round elimination: €350,000
 Third qualifying round elimination: €550,000
 Play-off round elimination: €750,000
 Qualified to Group Stage: €2,940,000
 Match won in Group Stage: €500,000
 Match drawn in Group Stage: €166,000
 1st in Group Stage: €650,000
 2nd in Group Stage: €325,000
 Knockout round play-offs: €300,000
 Round of 16: €600,000
 Quarter-final: €1,000,000
 Semi-final: €2,000,000
 Runner-up: €3,000,000
 Champion: €5,000,000

Also, each domestic champion not qualifying for the Group Stages of any  tournament receives an additional €260,000.

Records and statistics

Performances by club

All-time rankings 

Note: Clubs ranked on theoretical points total (2 points for a win, 1 point for draw, results after extra time count, all matches that went to penalties count as draw). Excludes qualifying matches.

Number of participating clubs in the group stage 

Team in Bold: qualified for knockout phase

Performances by nation

Awards
Starting from the first edition of the competition, UEFA introduced the UEFA Europa Conference League Player of the Season award.

The jury is composed of the coaches of the clubs which participate in the group stage of the competition, together with 55 journalists selected by the European Sports Media (ESM) group, one from each UEFA member association.

Winners

In the same season, UEFA also introduced the UEFA Europa Conference League Young Player of the Season award.

Winners

See also
 UEFA Intertoto Cup

Notes

References

External links

 Official website

 
Europa Conference League
Recurring sporting events established in 2021
3
Multi-national professional sports leagues
2021 establishments in Europe